Thomas Braddock may refer to:

Tom Braddock (1887–1976), British politician
Thomas Braddock (priest) (1556–1607), Anglican clergyman and author